Kerry Elizabeth Howard (born 24 March 1982) is an English actress. She played Laura in the BBC Three comedy series Him & Her and Leanne in Witless. She also appears in BBC Three "Feed My Funny" comedy sketches with Lu Corfield and acted as courtroom clerk in the first series of Judge Romesh.

Early life
Howard was born to Dave and Ninette Howard in 1982. She has a twin brother called Daniel and is the younger sister of comedian Russell Howard. She graduated with a BA (Hons) in Drama from Edge Hill University in 2003.

Filmography

References

External links

1982 births
Living people
English twins
21st-century English actresses
Alumni of Edge Hill University
English television actresses
People from Yeovil
Actresses from Bristol